Messenger Monsey (baptised 30 October 1694, died 26 December 1788) was an English physician and humorist. He became physician to the Royal Hospital, Chelsea, a home for injured and elderly soldiers. Known for his eccentricity and ill manners, he is described in the diaries of Fanny Burney as "Dr. Monso, a strange gross man".

Early life
Monsey, son of Robert Monsey, a non-juror cleric, and Mary (daughter of Roger Clopton, rector of Downham), was born at Hackford with Whitwell, Norfolk, and educated at home, then at Woodbridge School and Pembroke College, Cambridge (BA, 1714), before studying medicine under Sir Benjamin Wrench MD of Norwich (died 1747). Monsey was admitted to the Royal College of Physicians in 1723. He then practised in Bury St Edmunds, Suffolk, where he never earned more than £300 a year, but married well.

Move to London
Monsey was lucky enough to be called to treat Francis Godolphin, 2nd Earl of Godolphin, who was taken ill with apoplexy on the way to Newmarket. Godolphin – taken with Monsey's skill, raucous sense of humour and insolent familiarity – persuaded him to move to London, where he introduced him to patients such as the Prime Minister, Sir Robert Walpole, Lord Chesterfield and other prominent Whigs. Monsey also built up literary connections. For many years he paid court to the bluestocking Elizabeth Montagu, writing rhymed letters to her in the style of Swift. His friendship with David Garrick was broken after a quarrel. Dr Johnson disapproved of his coarse wit.

According to William Munk, "Monsey maintained his original plainness of manners, and with an unreserved sincerity sometimes spoke truth in a manner that gave offence; and as old age approached, he acquired an asperity of behaviour and a neglect of decorum.... As a physician he adhered to the tenets of the Boerhaavian school, and despised modern improvements in theory and practice." Monsey was a free-thinker in religious matters, or as Munk put it, "he shook off the manacles of superstition [and] he fell into the comfortless bigotry of scepticism." One man whom Monsey admired was the Dutch-born physician, philosopher and satirist Bernard Mandeville. Monsey's copy of Mandeville's The Fable of the Bees survives in the library of Sir John Soane's Museum, London, to which he presented it in 1781.

Legacy
Anecdotes about Monsey's eccentricities and unseemly language were collected after his death. He held his appointment to Chelsea Hospital, also obtained through Godolphin, until his death there on 26 December 1788 aged 96, after which he was dissected in a post mortem examination before students of Guy's Hospital, as he had requested. An extensive medical and personal correspondence between Monsey and the noted Norwich physician and philanthropist Benjamin Gooch survives in the British Library. On his death Monsey left £16,000 to his only daughter Charlotte, who had married William Alexander, brother to James Alexander, 1st Earl of Caledon.

Notes

Further reading

External links
A 1764 portrait of Monsey by Mary and Thomas Black: Retrieved 27 December 2014.
A 1789 hand-coloured etching of Monsey by James Gillray: Retrieved 27 December 2014.
The Eccentric Mirror, Vol. V, by G. H. Wilson (1807) contains a biography of Monsey. Retrieved 27 December 2014.

1694 births
1788 deaths
18th-century English medical doctors
Alumni of Pembroke College, Cambridge
People educated at Woodbridge School
People from South Norfolk (district)
People from Bury St Edmunds
People from Chelsea, London
English agnostics